The Instrumental Works is a 1988 compilation album by The Alan Parsons Project, featuring many of the band's instrumental tracks.

Tracks 
All tracks written by Alan Parsons and Eric Woolfson.

Credits 
 Art Direction, Design – Holland Macdonald
 Executive Producer – Eric Woolfson
 Mastered By – Ted Jensen
 Photography By – Michel Tcherevkoff
 Producer, Engineer – Alan Parsons

References

Further reading 
 Review: Saw Tek Meng, "The Sound Page", New Straits Times, 12 March 1989, p. 19.  

Alan Parsons albums
Albums produced by Alan Parsons
Arista Records compilation albums
1988 compilation albums
Instrumental compilation albums